Anton Weibel (born 8 September 1941) is a Swiss former footballer who played as a defender and made 13 appearances for the Switzerland national team.

Career
Weibel made his debut for Switzerland on 24 September 1969 in a friendly match against Turkey, which finished as a 0–3 loss. He went on to make 13 appearances before making his last appearance on 4 October 1972 in a friendly match against Denmark, which finished as a 1–1 draw.

Career statistics

International

References

External links
 
 
 

1941 births
Living people
Sportspeople from the canton of St. Gallen
Swiss men's footballers
Switzerland international footballers
Association football defenders
Grasshopper Club Zürich players
SC Brühl players
FC Lausanne-Sport players
FC Sion players
FC St. Gallen players
Swiss Super League players